The Association for Women in Computing (AWC) is a professional organization for women in computing. It was founded in 1978 in Washington, D.C., and is a member of the Institute for Certification of Computing Professionals (ICCP).

Purpose
The purpose of AWC is to provide opportunities for professional growth for women in computing through networking, continuing education and mentoring. To accomplish this they promote awareness of issues affecting women in the computing industry, further the professional development and advancement of women in computing, and encourage women to pursue careers in computer science. The AWC is a national, nonprofit, professional organization for women and men with an interest in information technology. It grants the Ada Lovelace Award to individuals who have excelled in either of two areas: outstanding scientific technical achievement and/or extraordinary service to the computing community through accomplishments and contributions on behalf of women in computing.

History 
AWC was founded in 1978 as a non-profit organization, originally under the name National Association for Women in Computing. The Puget Sound Chapter was founded in the winter of 1979 by Donnafaye Carroll Finger and Diane Haelsig. These two women read an article about a new association for women in computing and were soon discussing the formation of a Puget Sound Chapter. The Twin Cities Chapter of the AWC first met in December 1979, and became a chartered chapter on May 6, 1981.

Chapters
AWC has chapters in:
 Montana State University
 New Jersey
Seattle, Washington
 Twin Cities, Minnesota
 Puget Sound Washington

See also
 ACM-W
 Ada Lovelace Award
 Anita Borg
 Grace Hopper Celebration of Women in Computing
 Women in computing

References

External links
 Association for Women in Computing - Montana State University
 Association for Women in Computing – Northern New Jersey Chapter
 Association for Women in Computing – Puget Sound Chapter
 Association for Women in Computing – Twin Cities Chapter
 Association for Women in Computing (CBI 49), Charles Babbage Institute, University of Minnesota.  Correspondence, minutes, reports, proceedings, audio tapes, and artifacts that document the history and activities of the AWC.
 Association for Women in Computing, Twin Cities Chapter (CBI 7), Charles Babbage Institute, University of Minnesota. Administrative records created by the Twin Cities Chapter of the Association for Women in Computing

Organizations for women in science and technology
Professional associations for women
Women in computing
Professional associations based in the United States
Computer_science-related_professional_associations
Women in Washington, D.C.